Postwar: A History of Europe Since 1945 is a 2005 non-fiction book written by British historian and scholar Tony Judt who specialised in European history. The book examines six decades of European history from the end of World War II in 1945 up to 2005.

The book won considerable praise for its breadth and comprehensive approach.  The New York Times Book Review listed it as one of the ten best books of 2005. It won the 2006 Arthur Ross Book Award for the best book published on international affairs, and was shortlisted for the 2006 Samuel Johnson Prize. It also won the 2008 European Book Prize.

As is made clear in the introduction, the author makes no attempt to expound any grand theory or "overarching theme" for contemporary European history, aiming to avoid narrative fallacies by plainly retelling the entire scope of European history in that period, to let what themes do exist become self-apparent. Although praising the book's scope and quality, the historian Norman Davies nonetheless noted that it "is impervious to religion, unmoved by music and rather complacent about non-French and non-political branches of art and culture" and put less emphasis on the experiences of Ireland, the larger regions of France and Germany, and regionalism in general.

See also
History of Europe

References

 

2005 non-fiction books
History books about Europe
History books about the 20th century
21st-century history books
Penguin Press books
British non-fiction books